The 1979 Independence Bowl was a college football postseason bowl game between the McNeese State Cowboys and the Syracuse Orangemen.

Background
This was McNeese State's 2nd Southland Conference title in three years. This was Syracuse's first bowl game since 1966.

Game summary
Gary Anderson gave the Orangemen a 3–0 lead on his 40-yard kick in the second quarter that proved to be the halftime lead. Ken Mandeville made it 10–0 on his 1-yard run. McNeese State retaliated with a Chad Millet touchdown run to make it 10–7 going into the fourth quarter. A 15 play, 73 yard drive culminated with an Art Monk touchdown catch from Bill Hurley. Hurley added in a touchdown run to make it 24–7. Tom Matichak made it 31–7 on a touchdown run of his own to seal off the scoring and give the Orangement the win. Joe Morris ran for 155 yards on 33 carries for Syracuse in their first bowl win since 1961.

Aftermath
McNeese made one more bowl appearance in 1980, in the Independence Bowl. Syracuse made four more bowl appearances in the decade. They have not returned to the Independence Bowl since this game.

Statistics

References

Independence Bowl
Independence Bowl
McNeese Cowboys football bowl games
Syracuse Orange football bowl games
December 1979 sports events in the United States
Independence Bowl